Chenjerai Hove (9 February 1956 – 12 July 2015), was a Zimbabwean poet, novelist and essayist who wrote in both English and Shona. "Modernist in their formal construction, but making extensive use of oral conventions, Hove's novels offer an intense examination of the psychic and social costs - to the rural population, especially, of the war of liberation in Zimbabwe." He died on 12 July 2015 while living in exile in Norway, with his death attributed to liver failure.

Life
The son of a local chief Chenjerai Hove was born in Mazvihwa, near Zvishavane, in what was then Rhodesia. He attended school at Kutama College and Marist Brothers Dete, in the Hwange district of Zimbabwe. After studying in Gweru, he became a teacher and then took degrees at the University of South Africa and the University of Zimbabwe. He also worked as a journalist, and contributed to the anthology And Now the Poets Speak. He published regularly in The Zimbabwean, an opposition newspaper founded in 2005.

A critic of the  policies of the Mugabe government, Hove was living in exile at the time of his death as a fellow at the House of Culture in Stavanger, Norway, as part of the International Cities of Refuge Network (ICORN). Prior to this, he held visiting positions at Lewis and Clark College and Brown University; he was also once a poet-in-residence in Miami. Chenjerai Hove's work was translated into several languages (including Japanese, German, and Dutch). He won several awards over the course of his career, including the 1989 Noma Award for Publishing in Africa.

Publications
Chenjerai Hove published numerous novels, poetry anthologies and collections of essays and reflections. His publications include:

And Now the Poets Speak (co-editor; poetry), 1981
Up In Arms (poetry), Harare: Zimbabwe Publishing House, 1982
Red Hills of Home (poetry), 1984; Gweru: Mambo Press, 1985.
Bones (novel), Harare: Baobab Books, 1988; Heineman International AWS, 1989. 
Shadows (novel), Harare: Baobab Books, 1991; Heinemann International Literature and Textbooks, 1992. 
Shebeen Tales: Messages from Harare (journalistic essays), Harare: Baobab Books/London: Serif, 1994
Rainbows in the Dust (poetry), 1997
Guardians of the Soil (cultural reflections by Zimbabwe's elders), 1997. 
Ancestors (novel), 1997. 
Desperately Seeking Europe (co-author; essays on European identity), 2003
Palaver Finish, essays on politics and life in Zimbabwe, 2003
Blind Moon (poetry), 2004. 
The Keys of Ramb (children's story), 2004

Honours and awards
1983 Special Commendations for the Noma Award for Publishing in Africa, for Up in Arms
1984 Inaugural President, Zimbabwe Writers Union
1988 Winner, Zimbabwe Literary Award, for Bones
1989 Winner, Noma Award for Publishing In Africa, for Bones
1990 Founding Board Member, Zimbabwe Human Rights Association (Zimrights)
1991–94 Writer-in-Residence, University of Zimbabwe, Zimbabwe
1994 Visiting Professor, Lewis and Clark College, Portland, Oregon, USA
1995 Guest Writer, Yorkshire and Humberside Arts and Leeds University, UK
1996 Guest Writer, Heinrich Böll Foundation, Germany
1998 Second Prize, Zimbabwe Literary Award, for Ancestors
2001 German Africa Prize for literary contribution to freedom of expression
2007-08 International Writers Project Fellow, Brown University

References

External links
His biography at Brown University
Obituary  http://blogs.lse.ac.uk/africaatlse/2015/07/21/renowned-zimbabwe-writer-chenjerai-hove-remembered/

1956 births
2015 deaths
People from Midlands Province
University of South Africa alumni
University of Zimbabwe alumni
Zimbabwean essayists
Zimbabwean expatriates in South Africa
Zimbabwean novelists
Male novelists
Zimbabwean poets
Zimbabwean male writers
Male poets
Zimbabwean expatriates in the United States
Zimbabwean exiles
20th-century poets
20th-century novelists
20th-century essayists
Rhodesian educators
Zimbabwean educators
Rhodesian poets
20th-century male writers